You're in My Heart may refer to:

 "You're in My Heart (The Final Acclaim)", a song by Rod Stewart
 You're in My Heart (EP), an EP by Ten, or the title song
 "You're in My Heart", a song by LL Cool J from Walking with a Panther
 "You're in My Heart" (George Jones song)